Paracantha is a genus of fruit flies in the family Tephritidae.

Species
Paracantha australis Malloch, 1933
Paracantha culta (Wiedemann, 1830)
Paracantha cultaris (Coquillett, 1894)
Paracantha dentata Aczél, 1952
Paracantha forficula Benjamin, 1934
Paracantha genalis Malloch, 1941
Paracantha gentilis Hering, 1940
Paracantha haywardi Aczél, 1952
Paracantha multipuncta Malloch, 1941
Paracantha ruficallosa Hering, 1937
Paracantha trinotata (Foote, 1978)

References

Further reading

External links

 
 

Tephritinae
Tephritidae genera
Taxa named by Daniel William Coquillett